SpVgg Beckum is a German association football club from the city of Beckum, North Rhine-Westphalia. The team first came to note as a third-division side following the formation of the Bundesliga (I) in 1963.

History
The club was formed 1 January 1929 out of the merger of Verein für Bewegungsspiele 1910 Beckum and Spiel- und Sportverein 1923 Beckum. Shortly after its founding VfB adopted the name Fußball Club Westfalia 1910 Beckum until returning to their original name in 1916.

In 1963 SpVgg became part of the Amateurliga Westfalen (III) but was relegated after just two seasons. They returned to the Amateurliga in 1971 where they competed as a lower table side until again being demoted in 1979.

The team was absent from Amateurliga play for a decade until returning to what had become the Amateuroberliga Westfalen (III). They continued to play as an unremarked lower-level side and slipped to fourth-tier play in the Oberliga Westfalen in 1994 when German football was reorganized and the new third division Regionalliga introduced. Beckum's best result came in 1995 when they finished in third place. They also made appearances in the opening rounds of play for the DFB-Pokal (German Cup) in 1993 and 1996.

In 2001 Beckum was relegated from the Oberliga, and in the next year reached the lowest point in the club's history when they withdrew from the Verbandsliga (V) and restarted in the Kreisliga, achieving three promotions in the next four seasons to return to the Landesliga Westfalen.

The club played for a season in the tier eight Bezirksliga Westfalen after relegation from the Landesliga in 2015 but won the league and returned the seventh tier..

Seasons

References

External links 
 Official Website
Das deutsche Fußball-Archiv historical German domestic league tables 

Football clubs in Germany
Football clubs in North Rhine-Westphalia
Association football clubs established in 1929
1929 establishments in Germany